The non-marine molluscs of Mauritius are a part of the molluscan wildlife of Mauritius.

The Outer islands of Mauritius includes Cargados Carajos, Rodrigues and the Agalega Islands.

Freshwater gastropods 

Assimineidae
 Omphalotropis hieroglyphica Potiez & Michaud, 1838 – endemic, in salt marshes

Planorbidae
 Africanogyrus rodriguezensis (Crosse, 1873) – endemic
 Bulinus cernicus Morelet, 1867
 Gyraulus mauritianus Morelet – endemic

Land gastropods 

Pomatiidae
 Tropidophora articulata (Gray, 1834) – endemic
 Tropidophora michaudi Grateloup, 1840 – endemic

Achatinellidae
 Elasmias cernicum Benson, 1850
 Elasmias jaurffreti Madge, 1946 – endemic

Euconulidae
 Colparion madgei Laidlaw, 1938 – extinct, was endemic to Mauritius
 Ctenophila caldwelli Benson, 1859 – endemic
 Dancea rodriguezensis – endemic
 Dupontia levis Godwin-Austen, 1908 – endemic
 Dupontia perlucida Adams, 1867
 Dupontia poweri Adams, 1868 – endemic
 Dupontia proletaria Morelet, 1860 – extinct

Vertiginidae
 Nesopupa madgei Peile, 1936
 Nesopupa rodriguezensis Connolly, 1925 – endemic

Streptaxidae – genus Gibbus and genus Gonidomus were endemic to Mauritius, but they are now extinct.
 Gibbus lyonetianus Pallas, 1780 – endemic, extinct
 Gonidomus newtoni Adams, 1867 – endemic, extinct
 Gonidomus sulcatus Peile, 1936 – endemic
 Gonospira duponti Nevill, 1870 – endemic
 Gonospira holostoma Morelet, 1875 – endemic
 Gonospira madgei Kennard, 1943 – endemic
 Gonospira nevilli Adams, 1867 – endemic, extinct
 Gonospira striaticostus Morelet, 1866 – endemic
 Gonospira teres Pfeiffer, 1856 – endemic
 Gulella antelmeana Peile, 1936 – endemic
 Microstrophia modesta Adams, 1867 – endemic
 Microstrophia nana Peile, 1936 – endemic
 Plicadomus Swainson, 1840 – endemic genus
 Maurennea

Helicarionidae
 Erepta odontina Morelet, 1851 – endemic
 Erepta stylodon Pfeiffer, 1842 – endemic
 Harmogenanina implicata Nevill, 1870 – endemic
 Erepta nevilli – extinct, was endemic to Mauritius
 Thapsia snelli Connolly, 1925 – endemic

Freshwater bivalves

See also
 List of marine molluscs of Mauritius
 List of non-marine molluscs of the Seychelles
 List of non-marine molluscs of Madagascar
 List of non-marine molluscs of Réunion

References

 non-marine
Molluscs
Mauritius
Mauritius